The 2014–15 VCU Rams women's basketball team will represent Virginia Commonwealth University  during the 2014–15 college basketball season. Beth O'Boyle assumes the responsibility as head coach for her first season. The Rams were members of the Atlantic 10 Conference and play their home games at the Stuart C. Siegel Center. They finished the season 16–14, 7–9 in A-10 play to finish in a tie for eighth place. They lost in the second round of the A-10 women's tournament to Saint Louis.

2014–15 media
All non-televised Rams home games and conference road games will stream on the A-10 Digital Network.

Roster

Schedule

|-
!colspan=9 style="background:#F8B800; color:#000000;"| Regular Season

|-
!colspan=9 style="background:#000000; color:#F8B800;"| Atlantic 10 Tournament

Rankings
2014–15 NCAA Division I women's basketball rankings

See also
 2014–15 VCU Rams men's basketball team
 VCU Rams women's basketball

References

VCU Rams women's basketball seasons
VCU
VCU Rams women's basketball